Local elections were held in Manila on May 9, 2016, as a part of the 2016 Philippine general election. Voters elected candidates for mayor, vice mayor, six congressmen, and the 36 councilors that would be members of the city council. Incumbent mayor Joseph Estrada won the elections, securing him to serve his second three-year term as the mayor of Manila. He won by a slim margin at only more than 2,000 votes against his closest rival, former Manila mayor Alfredo Lim. Dr. Maria Sheilah “Honey” Lacuna-Pangan, daughter of former Manila vice mayor Danny Lacuna, Estrada’s running-mate, topped the vice mayoral race with 268,969 votes.

Background
Incumbent mayor and former president Joseph "Erap" Estrada was first elected as mayor in 2013. He defeated then-incumbent mayor Alfredo Lim in a closely contested election, winning 53% of the vote to Lim's 47%.

Estrada announced in April 2015 that he would be running for re-election. This was in total contrast to his May 9, 2012 pronouncement that he would only serve for one term should he be elected to the post back then, after which he would subsequently retire from politics.

Unlike Estrada, his running mate in 2013, three-term incumbent vice mayor Isko Moreno was term-limited, as he had served for three consecutive terms. He instead ran for a seat in the Senate.

Sources indicated that although Manila leaders identified with Estrada under the local Asenso Manileño party, Moreno included, were pushing for former Manila vice mayor Danilo Lacuna to be his running mate, Estrada was said to have seriously considered  his current city administrator, Jojo Alcovendaz, to be his vice mayoral candidate under his party, despite the latter's San Juan residence. However, the Estrada camp, upon further consultation, eventually chose former 4th district councilor and city social services head Honey Lacuna, Danilo's daughter, as his running mate.

On July 22, 2015, incumbent 5th district representative Amado Bagatsing launched his bid to be the next mayor of the city once governed by his father, former mayor Ramon Bagatsing, offering himself as an alternative while blaming the city’s "deterioration" on the incumbent and his predecessor. His running mate was the son of former mayor and current Buhay Party-list Representative Lito Atienza, current 5th district councilor and 2007 mayoral candidate Ali Atienza. On October 12, 2015, Bagatsing made his bid official by filing his certificate of candidacy.

On October 13, 2015, Alfredo Lim filed to run again for his old post. He was the official candidate of the ruling Liberal Party. His running mate was incumbent 1st district Rep. Benjamin Asilo.

Campaign

The local campaign period started on March 26, 2016. Estrada, with running mate Honey Lacuna, held their proclamation rally at the Liwasang Bonifacio, while Lim, with running mate Benjamin Asilo started their campaign at Plaza Miranda, on March 28, 2016, two days after the official start of campaigning for local candidates.

During the incumbent mayor's rally, Estrada formally endorsed his goddaughter Grace Poe as his choice for president and Bongbong Marcos for vice president. He picked Poe over his running mate Jejomar Binay of the United Nationalist Alliance. He said that the mayor's gratitude to the presidential candidate's father Fernando Poe, Jr., a candidate of the 2004 Philippine presidential election but later lost, as one of the reasons why he made the decision to endorse Poe.

Among Estrada's senatorial candidates that he supported were Joel Villanueva, Panfilo Lacson, Manny Pacquiao, Martin Romualdez, Getulio Napeñas, Neri Javier Colmenares, Sherwin Gatchalian, Richard J. Gordon, Juan Miguel Zubiri, Sergio Osmeña III, Francis Tolentino and Isko Moreno, the incumbent vice mayor of the city. Major roads in Manila including the McArthur Bridge were closed down due to the event.

Lim's campaign started with his visit to the Islamic Center in Barangay San Miguel, together with Liberal Party's presidential bet Mar Roxas. The two then went to Plaza Miranda for the former mayor's proclamation rites, which was attended by 5,000 supporters. Roxas' running mate Leni Robredo and President Benigno Aquino III also attended the rally.

A day before the two rallies, Amado Bagatsing and his running mate Ali Atienza kicked-off their campaign at Tondo.

Mayoralty and vice mayoralty elections

Mayor
First-term incumbent and former president Joseph Estrada, who was elected with 53% of the vote in 2013, sought another term. Former senator and Manila mayor Alfredo Lim, who Estrada defeated in 2013, sought a rematch. Fifth District Representative Amado Bagatsing also ran.

Vice mayor

Three-term incumbent Francisco "Isko Moreno" Domagoso, who was re-elected with 63% of the vote in 2013, was term-limited and barred from running again for this post this election. His party's nominee was Maria Sheilah "Honey" Lacuna-Pangan. Facing her were three-term representatives Benjamin Asilo of the 1st district and Trisha Bonoan-David of the 4th district. Incumbent 5th District councilor and former 2007 mayoral candidate Ali Atienza also ran for the seat.

District representatives

1st district

The 1st district is composed of the western part of Tondo. Three-term Liberal Party incumbent Benjamin "Atong" Asilo, who was re-elected with 64% of the vote in 2013, was term-limited and instead ran for vice mayor; his brother, incumbent councilor Roberto Asilo, was his party's nominee.

Also running for this district were incumbent three-term councilors Ian "Banzai" Nieva and Ernesto Dionisio, Jr as well as Manuel "Manny" Lopez. Nieva is the son of the late Ernesto "Banzai" Nieva, who represented this district from 1998 to 2007, while Lopez is the son of former Manila mayor Mel Lopez.

2nd district

The city's 2nd district covers the eastern part of Tondo, a place known as Gagalangin. Carlo Lopez was the incumbent representative and had already served two terms. He won on the 2010 local elections and was re-elected with 69% of the vote in 2013. He ran for his third and final term under the Liberal Party. He ran unopposed because his supposed opponent, Councilor Numero "Uno" Lim, was nominated by the party-list group Tanggol Maralita Inc. (TAMA).

3rd district

The 3rd district is composed of Binondo, Quiapo, San Nicolas, and Santa Cruz. Zenaida "Naida" Angping, who was re-elected with 62% of the vote in 2013, was term-limited and barred from running again this election. Her party nominated her husband, former representative Harry Angping who represented this district from 1998 to 2004.

His opponents were three-term incumbent city councilor and actor John Marvin "Yul Servo" Nieto and former councilor Ramon Morales. Morales also ran in this district in 2013 and lost receiving only 36% of the vote.

4th district

The 4th district is composed of Sampaloc. Ma. Theresa "Trisha" Bonoan-David, who ran unopposed in 2013, was term-limited and barred from running again this election. Her party nominated her sister, Annie.

Other candidates for this district were six-term councilor Edward Maceda, two-term councilor Don Juan "DJ" Bagatsing, one-term councilor Science Reyes, and former Ateneo basketball player Jobe Nkemakolam.

5th district

The 5th district is composed of Ermita, Malate, Paco (south), Intramuros, Port Area, and San Andres Bukid (including the Manila South Cemetery). Amado Bagatsing, who was re-elected with 89% of the vote in 2013, was term-limited and barred from running again this election and instead ran for mayor. His party's nominee was his daughter Cristal.

Her opponents were former representatives Joey Hizon and Mary Ann Susano as well as incumbent three-term councilor Josie Siscar. 
Joey Hizon represented this district from 1998 to 2007. Meanwhile, Mary Ann Susano represented Quezon City's 2nd congressional district from 2004 to 2010.

6th district

The 6th district is composed of Paco (north), Pandacan, Santa Ana, San Miguel, and Santa Mesa. Two-term incumbent Sandy Ocampo, who won re-election in 2013 with 51% of the vote, sought a third term. She was co-nominated by NUP and local party KABAKA while Benny Abante was also co-nominated by Asenso Manileño Party.

This is the third straight election in which the two candidates faced each other with Ocampo winning the first two by narrow margins.

City council

1st district
Incumbent councilors Dennis Alcoreza, Ernesto Dionisio Jr., and Erick Ian Nieva were term-limited and could not seek re-election. Meanwhile, councilors Irma Alfonso and Roberto Asilo, who were not term-limited, chose not to seek re-election. Of the six councilors representing this district, only Niño dela Cruz sought re-election.

Former councilors Rolando Sy, Jesus Fajardo Sr., Ernesto Dionisio Sr., Arlene Koa, Moises Lim, Martin Isidro Jr., and Abraham Cabochan each tried to regain a seat in the council.

 
 
 
 
 
 
|-
| colspan="5" style="background:black;"|

2nd District
Incumbent councilors Marlon Lacson and Numero Lim could not seek re-election. Councilors Ruben Buenaventura, Rodolfo Lacsamana, Ramon Robles, and Rolando Valeriano were all seeking another term.

Among those vying for a seat in the council were former councilors Edward Tan and Nelissa Beltran.

 
 
 
 
 
 
|-
| colspan="5" style="background:black;"|

3rd District
Incumbent councilors Joel Chua, Ernesto Isip Jr., and John Marvin "Yul Servo" Nieto were term-limited and could not seek re-election. Meanwhile, councilors Bernardito Ang, Ma. Asuncion Fugoso, and Manuel Zarcal were all vying for another term.

 
 
 
 
 
 
|-
| colspan="5" style="background:black;"|

4th district
Incumbent councilors Edward Maceda and Jocelyn Quintos were term-limited and could not seek re-election. Meanwhile, councilors Don Juan Bagatsing, and Science Reyes, who were not term-limited, chose not to seek re-election. Councilors Krystle Bacani and Anton Capistrano both vyed for a second term.

Among those who were gunning for a council seat were former councilors Luisito Chua, Eduardo "Wardee" Quintos XIV, and Victoriano Melendez. Eduardo 'Bimbo' Quintos XVI would not run for councilor due to his disqualification case in the office.

 
 
 
 
 
 
|-
| colspan="5" style="background:black;"|

5th district
Incumbent councilors Cristina Isip, Josefina Siscar, and Raymundo Yupangco were barred by term limits from seeking re-election. Meanwhile, councilor Arnold Atienza, who was not term-limited, chose not to seek another term. Councilors Joey Hizon III and Roberto Ortega Jr. both vied for another term.

Among those who sought a council seat were former councilors Richard Ibay, Roderick Valbuena, and Arturo Valenzona. Three-term Buhay Party-list Rep. Irwin Tieng also ran for a council seat in this district.
 
  
 
  
  
  
 
|-
| colspan="5" style="background:black;"|

6th district
Incumbent councilors Priscilla Marie Abante, Leilani Marie Lacuna, Joel Par, Elizabeth Rivera, Casimiro Sison, and Christian Paul Uy all sought another term.

Among those who ran for a council seat were former councilors Carlos Castañeda, Pablo Dario Ocampo, and Luciano Veloso. Castañeda served in the city council as the president of the Liga ng mga Barangay from 2004 to 2007, while Ocampo represented the 5th district from 1995 to 1998.

 
 
 
  
 
 
|-
| colspan="5" style="background:black;"|

References

2016 Philippine local elections
Elections in Manila
Politics of Manila
2016 elections in Metro Manila